Monika Ciecierska (born 23 October 1973) is a former Polish female professional basketball player.

External links
Profile at fibaeurope.com

1973 births
Living people
People from Szprotawa
Polish women's basketball players
Small forwards
Power forwards (basketball)